Yvonne Helen Fovargue (born 29 November 1956) is a British Labour Party politician serving as Member of Parliament (MP) for Makerfield since 2010.

Early life and career 

Fovargue attended Sale Grammar School and obtained a Bachelor of Arts in English from the University of Leeds. In the 1980s, she worked as a housing officer on the Moss Side estate, before becoming the Chief Executive of St Helens Citizens Advice Bureau, a role she held for over 20 years.

She also served as a local councillor in Warrington from 2004 until her election as an MP in 2010.

Parliamentary career

Fovargue was elected with a majority of 12,490 at the 2010 general election. She was appointed as an Opposition Whip in 2011 and served as Shadow Transport Minister and Shadow Defence Minister.

She was then appointed as a Shadow Education Minister with responsibility for Further Education and Skills in October 2014 following the resignation of Rushanara Ali. She resigned from this role in March 2019 after voting against the Labour whip in a vote on a second Brexit referendum.

She supported Owen Smith in the failed attempt to replace Jeremy Corbyn in the 2016 Labour Party (UK) leadership election.

Yvonne Fovargue is a member of the Unite trade union and the Co-operative Party.

Fovargue supported neighboring MP Lisa Nandy in the 2020 Labour Party leadership election.

Personal life

Fovargue is married with one adult daughter. She is also a member of Mensa and an avid reader of crime fiction.

References

External links
Official website
Twitter

1956 births
Living people
Alumni of the University of Leeds
Labour Party (UK) MPs for English constituencies
UK MPs 2010–2015
UK MPs 2015–2017
UK MPs 2019–present
People educated at Sale Grammar School
Mensans
Female members of the Parliament of the United Kingdom for English constituencies
People from Sale, Greater Manchester
21st-century British women politicians
UK MPs 2017–2019
Members of the Parliament of the United Kingdom for Makerfield
21st-century English women
21st-century English people